Uwe Hesse (born 16 December 1987) is a German footballer who plays for KSG Georgenhausen.

References

External links
 
 Uwe Hesse at FuPa

1987 births
Living people
German footballers
SV Darmstadt 98 players
SSV Jahn Regensburg players
SC Hessen Dreieich players
2. Bundesliga players
3. Liga players
Regionalliga players
Association football midfielders
People from Rüsselsheim
Sportspeople from Darmstadt (region)
Footballers from Hesse